Michael Twittmann (born 23 June 1965) is a German rower. He competed in the men's coxless pair event at the 1988 Summer Olympics.

References

External links
 

1965 births
Living people
German male rowers
Olympic rowers of West Germany
Rowers at the 1988 Summer Olympics
People from Kamen
Sportspeople from Arnsberg (region)